Taksin Maharat National Park is a national park in Tak Province, Thailand. Home to Thailand's largest tree, the park also features waterfalls, caves, and rock formations.

Geography
The park's area is 93,126 rai ~ . The mountains of the Thanon Thongchai Range run through the park's centre.

History
It is believed that the Burmese King Alaungpaya used to march his army through this area. The park's original name was Ton Krabak Yai National Park, named for the park's enormous krabak tree. On 23 December 1981, the park was designated Thailand's 38th national park. It was later renamed Taksin Maharat National Park ("King Taksin the Great") in honour of King Taksin of the Thonburi Kingdom.

Sights

The tree is believed to be the largest in Thailand.
Saphan Hin (Stone Bridge) (สะพานหินธรรมชาติ) Saphan Hin is a natural stone bridge spanning two cliffs with a stream flowing beneath. Nearby is the Tran Loard Krow Cave featuring stalactites and stalagmites.
Namtok Pang A Noi (น้ำตกปางอ้าน้อย) This middle-sized waterfall flows all year round. It is around 20 m high, and around 2 km away from Ton Krabak Yai to the east.
Namtok Mae Ya Pa (น้ำตกแม่ย่าป้า) This mid–sized waterfall originates from Lam Huai Mae Ya Pa in a dense forest. It flows in layers along the creek into Lam Huai Mae Tho.
Namtok Sam Muen Thung (น้ำตกสามหมื่นทุ่ง) This giant waterfall of 30 m high originates from Lam Huai Sam Muen Luang and flows year round.

Flora and fauna
Ton Krabak Yai (Anisoptera costata) is part of the park's lower-elevation dipterocarp forest. Evergreen and pine forests inhabit the park's higher elevations. Other tree species include Baccaurea ramiflora and Toona ciliata.

Animal species include sambar, northern red muntjac, common palm civet, mongoose, treeshrew and wild boar.  The park is a noted bird watching area, with species including ashy drongo, barn swallow, black-naped oriole, collared scops owl, great barbet, greater coucal, green pigeon, olive-backed sunbird, Oriental white-eye, plaintive cuckoo, scarlet minivet, sooty-headed bulbul, spotted dove, tiger shrike, forest wagtail, and Chinese pond heron.

See also
List of national parks of Thailand
List of Protected Areas Regional Offices of Thailand

References

National parks of Thailand
Geography of Tak province
Tourist attractions in Tak province
1981 establishments in Thailand
Protected areas established in 1981